Mauli was a dynasty of kings that ruled the Bhumi Malayu or Dharmasraya kingdom, centered in the Batanghari river system (today Jambi and West Sumatra provinces, Sumatra), from the 11th century to the 14th century. Most Mauli kings were Mahayana—Vajrayana Buddhists.

The dynasty appeared almost two centuries after the fall of the Sailendra dynasty that ruled Srivijaya, after the Chola invasion in 1025, led by Rajendra from Tamil Nadu, India. It seems that the family was once the member of the Srivijayan mandala and stepped into the power to rule the former Srivijayan mandala which included Sumatra and Malay Peninsula. The dynasty was based on the Batanghari river system, initially centered in Muaro Jambi, and considered as the successor state of Srivijaya. In the later period, the kingdom's capital shifted inland upstream from Batanghari to Dharmasraya, and later moved further inland to Pagaruyung in present-day West Sumatra province.

List of rulers
Following is the list of Mauli kings that ruled Bhumi Malayu:

See also

 History of Indonesia
 Melayu Kingdom
 Srivijaya
 Malay

References

Precolonial states of Indonesia
Former monarchies of Asia
Malay kingdoms
Srivijaya
Dharmasraya